This page is a list of Marathi sportspersons.

Cricketers

 Aavishkar Salvi – Is an Indian cricketer. He is a right-arm medium-pace bowler and right-handed batsman. In first class cricket, he plays for Mumbai. 
 Ajinkya Rahane – Is a right-handed batsman, who represents India, He is one of the only 11 players to have scored more than 1000 runs in a single Ranji Trophy season
 Ajit Agarkar – Has a record of fastest 50 scored, 2nd fastest ODI wickets, has 288 ODI wickets under his belt
 Ajit Wadekar – He becoming the first Indian captain to achieve series victories on tours to the West Indies and in England
 Anshuman Gaekwad – He was known for his defensive mindset against pace bowlers, which became a high priority when the West Indian pace bowlers dominated world cricket. He was nicknamed The Great Wall
 Bapu Nadkarni – He bowled 21 maiden overs in succession. The record for most consecutive balls without conceding a run is held by Hugh Tayfield of South Africa
 Baloo Gupte – Was a leg-spinner, made his debut under Nari Contractor in 1960–61 against Pakistan led by Fazal Mahmood
 Chandrakant Pandit – He played in 5 Tests and 36 ODIs from 1986 to 1992. He became a cricket coach, enjoying successful stints with the Mumbai cricket team
 Chandrasekhar Gadkari – He made a fine impression as a fielder in the 1952/53 tour to West Indies in an Indian side that was noted for its fielding
 Chandrakant Patankar – He was a wicketkeeper and lower-order right-handed batsman
 Chandu Borde – He made his debut in the First Test during the West Indies tour of India, received the Arjuna Award, Padma Shri, Padma Bhushan
 Dhawal Kulkarni – Is an Indian first class cricketer, he plays for Mumbai and in the Indian Premier League, he plays for Mumbai Indians
 Dattu Phadkar – Was an all-rounder who represented India in Test cricket
 Dattaram Hindlekar – Toured England in 1936 and 1946 as India's first choice wicket-keeper
 Dilip Sardesai – His important century of 112 in the next Test at Port of Spain led to India's first victory over West Indies
 Dilip Vengsarkar – He was one of the most stylish batsmen of his time, he a nickname 'Colonel', received the Arjuna Award in 1981, Padma Shri honour in 1987
 Eknath Solkar – Renowned for his excellent close fielding, 53 catches in only 27 matches is the best ratio of any non-keeper with 20 or more Tests, responsible for one of cricket's most celebrated quotes, directed at Geoffrey Boycott: I will out you bloody
 Hemu Adhikari- He helped guide India to their first series win in England in 1971
 Hemant Kanitkar – Is an Indian first class cricketer, represented India in Tests in 1974
 Hrishikesh Kanitkar – He scored prolifically for the Maharashtra cricket team in the Ranji Trophy to bring himself into contention for national selection
Abhijit Kale-prolific domestic run getter, played for India in one day international.
 Kedar Jadhav - He is a right-handed middle-order batsman 
 Khandu Rangnekar – Started his first class career in the Bombay Pentangular and scored a hundred in his first appearance in the Ranji Trophy, played for India in 1947–48
 Kiran More – Was the wicket-keeper for the Indian cricket team, he was the Chairman of the Selection Committee of the BCCI
 Lisa Sthalekar- Australian women cricketer of Indian origin
 Manohar Hardikar – Was an Indian Test cricketer, he captained Mumbai in twelve matches, winning five and drawing the rest
 Nilesh Kulkarni – Was only Indian to take a wicket with the very first ball that he bowled in Test cricket, and 12th bowler in the history of the game
 Poonam Raut- Indian women cricketer
 Pravin Amre – Is an Indian cricketer, is the current coach of the Mumbai cricket team
 Ramesh Powar – He played a large role in Mumbai's successful 2002–03 season in the Ranji Trophy
 Rahul Dravid – He is the First Indian to have scored 10000 runs at no 3 position
 Ramnath Parkar – Was an Indian cricketer who played in Tests in 1972
 Ramakant Achrekar – In 1990, he was honoured with the Dronacharya Award for his services to cricket coaching
 Salil Ankola – He was the first player to hit a sixer on the first ball of the match, he did so on to Pakistani legend Imran Khan
 Sameer Dighe – Was an Indian cricketer. He is a right-handed batsman and a wicketkeeper
 Sanjay Bangar – He scored 100 not out against Zimbabwe at Nagpur batting at number 7
 Subhash Gupte – He was one of Test cricket's finest spin bowlers. Sir Garry Sobers pronounced him the best leg spinner that it had been his pleasure to see
 Sachin Tendulkar – He is the First Indian to score 100 Internationals 100's in the game of cricket
 Sairaj Bahutule – Is an Indian cricketer. He is an allrounder who specialises in leg-spinbowling
 Sandeep Patil – Is a former Indian cricketer, also former Kenya national team coach, who made the minnows reach the semi-final of the 2003 World Cup
 Sanjay Manjrekar – His first notable performance at the international level came in the 1989 series against the West Indies in the West Indies.
 Smriti Mandhana - Indian woman cricketer
 Sunil Gavaskar – Is the First Indian to aggregate more than 700 runs in a series, and this 774 runs at 154.80 remains the most runs scored in a debut series by any batsman
 Vinod Kambli – He made two double-centuries and two centuries in seven tests
 Vijay Hazare – Is a former Indian cricketer, becoming the First Indian player to complete 1000 Test Runs
 Vijay Manjrekar – Former Indian cricketer who played 55 Tests, holds the records for the most test runs scored without hitting a single six
 Zaheer Khan – He was the mainstay of Indian bowling attack during the side's victorious 2011 World Cup campaign, also was the leading wicket-taker in the tournament
 Wasim Jaffer – Highest run scorer in Ranji Trophy, he signed to Himley CC as their overseas professional in the Birmingham and District Premier League
 Shubhangi Kulkarni – Indian women cricketer, was the secretary of the Women's Cricket Association of India
 Sushil Nadkarni – American cricketer
 Paras Mhambrey - 2 Tests and 1 ODI
 Abey Kuruvilla - 10 Tests and 25 ODI's
 Rohan Gavaskar - 11 ODI's India
 Shardul Thakur
 Ruturaj Gaikwad - Ruturaj Dashrat Gaikwad (born 31 January 1997) is an Indian cricketer who plays for Maharashtra in domestic cricket and for the Chennai Super Kings in the Indian Premier League (IPL). He made his international debut for the India cricket team in July 2021.[1][2] He was the leading run-scorer in the 2021 Indian Premier League tournament.[3]

Badminton 
 Nandu Natekar – The First Indian to win a title abroad – the Men's singles in the Selangor International Tournament in Kuala Lumpur in 1956, the First Arjuna Award winner
 Nikhil Kanetkar – Badminton Player
 Aditi Mutatkar – She was a Semifinalist Croatia open 2008 and Pre quarter finalist in Yonex sunrise Indian open – Hyderabad in 2008
 Damayanti Tambay – Four times national champion
 Sukant Kadam - Professional Para badminton Player. Many International Gold Medal winner. Former World no 2. 
 Nilesh Gaikwad - Professional Para badminton Player. Asian Youth Games Dubai 2017 Silver Medalist. Uganda Para Badminton International 2017 Gold Medalist.

Chess 
 Pravin Thipsay - GM (1997)
 Abhijit Kunte - GM (2000)
 Swati Ghate - WGM (2004)
 Rucha Pujari - WIM (2017), previously WFM (2006)
 Vidit Gujrathi - GM (2013)
 Raunak Sadhvani - GM (2020)
 Swapnil Dhopade - GM (2016)
 Abhimanyu Puranik - GM (2017)
 Akshayraj Kore - GM (2013)
 Sagar Shah - IM (2014)
 Soumya Swaminathan - IM (2020) and WGM (2008)
 Divya Deshmukh - WIM (2020)

Bodybuilding 
 Suhas Khamkar
 Sangram Chougule

Rifle & Pistol Shooting 

 Anjali Bhagwat - Four gold medal winner at Manchester Commonwealth games 2002
 Tejaswini Sawant – First Indian woman shooter to win gold at the World Championships. Gold medalist at Commonwealth Games at Melbourne.
 Rahi Sarnobat – Gold medal winner at Delhi Commonwealth 2010

Football 
 Mahesh Gawli – India national football team member
 Sameer Naik – India national football team member
 Brahmanand Sankhwalkar – Prominent soccer player
 Ramchandra Parab – Footballer who played for India in the 1948 Olympics in England
 Raju Gaikwad - India national football team member
 Mandar Rao Desai

Long Distance running 
 Kavita Raut – Is a long-distance runner, holds current Indian National record for 10 km road running with a mark of 34:32, set at the Sunfeast World 10K in Bangalore
 Lalita Babar - She predominantly competes in the 3000 metres steeplechase and is the current Indian national record holder and the reigning Asian Champion in the same event.

Mountaineering 
 Ashish Mane - First Maharashtrian to climb four of the fourteen peaks over 8,000 metres (26,000 ft) above sea level. 
 Krushnaa Patil – Second Youngest Indian to climb Mt. Everest at the age of 19, First Maharashtrian woman to climb Mt. Everest

Wrestlers 
 Khashaba Jadhav – First Olympic medal for India in 1952
 Rahul Aware
 Maruti Mane
 Ganpat Andhalkar
 Harishchandra Birajdar

Field Hockey 
 Tushar Khandekar – Hockey Forward, often referred to as "The Goal Poacher" [1]
 Bandu Patil - Tokyo Olympics 1964
 Shantaram Jadhav - Rome Olympics 1960
 Govind Sawant - Rome Olympics 1960

Parachute Jump 
 Shital Mahajan - Skydiver, the Government of India honored with Padma Shri in 2011.

Swimming 
 Murlikant Petkar - Swimmer, First Paralympic medal for India, gold medal in 1972 Summer Paralympics.

 Virdhawal Khade - Swimmer, India’s fastest swimmer, Olympian

Tennis 
 Gaurav Natekar
 Prarthana Thombare

See also 
 List of Marathi People in the performing arts

References 

Marathi
Sports
Sports